Jennifer Senior is an American journalist and author. She is a staff writer at The Atlantic. She is the winner of the 2022 Pulitzer Prize for Feature Writing.

She is the author of the 2014 book All Joy and No Fun: The Paradox of Modern Parenthood. She graduated from Princeton University, majoring in anthropology, in 1991.

She has written about her experience suffering from Long COVID: "Long COVID symptoms often change. This syndrome is wily, protean—imagine a mischief of mice moving through the walls of your house and laying waste to different bits of circuitry and infrastructure as they go."

References

External links
 Official website

Year of birth missing (living people)
Living people
Place of birth missing (living people)
Princeton University alumni
American women journalists
Pulitzer Prize winners